Yupei is a generic term for jade pendants. Yupei were popular even before Confucius was born. Jade culture is an important component of Chinese culture, reflecting both the material and spiritual culture. Jade is deeply ingrained in Chinese culture and played a role in every aspect of social life; it is also associated with positive qualities and aspects such as purity, excellence, and harmony.Jade is even more valued than gold in Chinese culture. The history of the art of jade carving in China to make ornaments, including dress ornaments, extends back to before 5000 BC. Ancient Chinese held even greater importance to yupei after it was regarded as a moral integrity by Confucius. Yupei could be used as belt or waist ornaments (such as jinbu 禁步) and as necklaces which appeared as early as the Liangzhu culture. Strings of jade pendant are also used to decorate headwear, such as the mianguan.

Terminology 
Yupei is composed of the Chinese character yu which literally means 'jade' and pei which means 'pendant'.

While the term 'jade' typically refer to nephrite and jadeite in scholarly literature, the character yu in China can also be applied to other forms of precious stones and materials, such as agate, serpentine, soapstone, marble, tremolite, and hornblende The True jade in China is actually the nephrite, which have been used and prized for millennia in China. It is only since the 18th century that jadeite (from Burma) was discovered by Chinese carvers and started to be used in China. Jadeite became popular in jewellery making due to its bright green colour.

Design and construction 
Yupei could be stringed together to make an ensemble of jade pendants (which would hold at the belt and could also be composed of chains of bi (璧; jade discs or jade rings). Jade in the form of huang were also popular in the making of yupei and had a rigid and specific rules attached to its use. Some jade pendants also combined jades in the shape of dragons, phoenixes, anthropomorphic figures, human-dragons, and animals (birds, badgers), and/or could be carved in the shapes of diverse objects (such as gourds) or with Chinese characters (e.g. double happiness). Jades in the form of bi and cong (jade tubes) appeared as early as the Liangzhu Neolithic culture (c. 3000 BC) in Zhenjiang and Jiangsu provinces.

Jinbu (禁步) 

Jinbu appeared thousands of years ago and were initially only worn by nobles, but with time, it was gradually adopted by all women regardless of their social ranks. The jinbu also used to be an indicator of elegance and etiquette in ancient times: if the behavior of its wearer is discourteous (i.e. walking too fast), the jinbu would sound loud and thus, the jinbu would remind the wearer to mind his manners and elegance; on the other hand, if its wearer behave appropriately, the jinbu would sound melodic and pleasant. This is also explained in the chapter《玉藻 Yu Zao》in the Liji:

History

Ancient 
In the pre-Qin period, unearthed jade pendants were found to be carved in human and anthropomorphic figures and/or combination of human and animals design (e.g. human faces, eagle sizing the head of a man), dragons (e.g. pierced-dragon shape), phoenix (e.g. pierced-phoenix shape), animals (such as birds) and carved in shape of bi, and semi-disc shape (half-bi) jade pendants. Huang and half-bi were sometimes used as component of an ensemble of jade pendant. Jade pendants could also be found in strings of jade ornaments (e.g. in the forms of small jade tubes, called cong). Strings of jade could also be combined with other forms of jade pendants. Jade pendants worn as necklace appeared as early as the Liangzhu culture.

Zhou dynasty 

In the Western Zhou, people started to associate moral connotations to the use of jade, such as morality. This eventually led to the formation of Chinese jade belief system of how "a gentleman compares virtues to a gem", a concept which was later fully elaborated by Confucius, who would then compare the qualities of a jade to the 5 virtues (kindness, wisdom, integrity, courage, and purity) of a gentleman (junzi) in the Book of Rites (Liji).

White jade, Hotan jade in particular, was well-liked in the Western Zhou; however, strict regulations on the use of jades, based on their qualities and colours, were established. While rulers of the Western Zhou would use expensive jades (like white Hotan jade), people of lower status could only use common jades. Ensemble of yupei (jinbu) were a distinctive form of ritual jade ware in the Western Zhou dynasty, and jades in huang shape were dominant types of yupei found in the ensemble. The jade pendant ensemble consisted of various parts which had to be connected together based on certain rules.

In the Zhou dynasty, ensemble of yupei would often hang down at the waist belt of its wearer. Ensemble of yupei which were made entirely of jade may have only used by rulers of kingdoms (possibly dukes, marquises, their wives and aristocrats of similar titles) as the ritual system which is stipulated in the Liji indicates that pure jade could not be used by the ministers of kings. According to the chapter《玉藻 Yu Zao》:

Moreover, according to the Confucian jade-related belief system which also stems from the Liji: in ancient China, yupei ensemble (which symbolizes virtue) must always been worn by gentlemen except when they are mourning. Wearing yupei ensemble also served to: (1) remind its wearer to walk in an orderly manner which would eventually make gentlemen develop an elegant and regular walking pattern over the years despite being constrained by the jade pendants, and (2) remind the gentlemen to behave according to the decorum which is based on the sound of the jade tinkles when they walk.

Tang dynasty 
It is confirmed based on paintings and stone engravings that ensemble of jade pendants were suspended from the belt of women in the Tang dynasty.

Qing dynasty 
In Qing, it was popular for women to wear green, translucent jade jewelries; pendants which were carved in the shape of a curving dragon was popular.

Gallery

Similar items 

 Yajin - Chinese accessories which hungs on clothing lapels at the chest area
 Shibazi - An 18-beads bracelet, which can be hang on Chinese clothing lapels at the chest area
 Yaopei
 Norigae - A Korean clothing accessory

See also 

 Hanfu
 List of hanfu
 List of hanfu accessories
 Chaozhu (Court necklace)

References 

Chinese traditional clothing
Jade
Hardstone carving
Chinese art